Charles Russell Hardman was an American artist from Florida. He painted works in U.S. Post Offices under a Treasury Department program. His "Indians Receiving Gifts" mural is at the Guntersville Post Office in Guntersville, Alabama. His "Episodes from the History of Florida" (1940) oil on canvas was painted for the Miami Beach Branch Post Office.

References

Painters from Florida
American muralists
Year of birth missing
Year of death missing
American male painters
20th-century American painters
Section of Painting and Sculpture artists
20th-century American male artists